The Haas VF-22 is a Formula One racing car designed and constructed by the Haas F1 Team to compete in the 2022 Formula One World Championship. The VF-22 is Haas' seventh car entry into Formula One. It has been driven by Kevin Magnussen, Mick Schumacher, and Nikita Mazepin, the lattermost who was replaced by Magnussen before the season-opening Bahrain Grand Prix. The car runs on power units supplied by Ferrari.

The VF-22 was the first Formula One car of 2022 to be revealed pre-season. Due to the major change to the Formula One regulations which affected the appearance of the cars, development on the VF-21 used in the 2021 season was cut short, and the team instead focused on the 2022 season.

This car is notable for being the first ever Haas Formula One car to take a pole position, in the hands of Magnussen, at the 2022 São Paulo Grand Prix at Interlagos. Haas had an overall improved season, moving up from 10th in the constructors championship to 8th and back to scoring points regularly.

Development 
Haas did not develop its previous car in 2021 and instead focused on the VF-22 during the whole 2021 championship due to a regulation change. For a seventh consecutive year, Haas selected a Ferrari engine for its car. On 4 February, the VF-22 became the first 2022 car to be revealed.

Livery 
The car was revealed and initially tested in a livery similar to the previous season's VF-21, with the title sponsorship from Russian company Uralkali and designs across the car, particularly on the front wing, resembling the Russian flag. Following the 2022 Russian invasion of Ukraine on 24 February, Haas removed the Uralkali branding from their car and website. The final day of the first pre-season test on 25 February was run with the car carrying a modified black-and-white livery. The sponsorship was later terminated along with Mazepin's contract on 5 March. An updated livery with the color red replacing the Russian flag stripe, was used during the second test in Bahrain.

Competition history 

Magnussen drove the car to 7th in qualifying and finished 5th in the Bahrain Grand Prix. In the same race, Schumacher placed 12th in qualifying and 11th in the actual race.

The following weekend in Saudi Arabia, Magnussen qualified 10th and finished 9th. Schumacher's VF-22 lost back end control after hitting a curb in Q2, and hitting a wall. While Schumacher sustained no injuries, the damages to the VF-22 were estimated at $1M. Only one VF-22 raced the following day.

At Imola, Magnussen scored points in both the sprint race and full Grand Prix with an 8th and 9th-place finish respectively.  The following races would prove barren for both drivers, including a large crash for Schumacher at Monaco where his car split in two after an incident in the Swimming Pool section of the circuit.

At the British Grand Prix Mick Schumacher scored his first Formula One points driving the VF-22 finishing in 8th place. Magnussen was 10th. At the following round in Austria, Schumacher finished in 6th. Teammate Kevin Magnussen also scored points in Austria in both sprint and Grand Prix races.

At the São Paulo Grand Prix, Kevin Magnussen took the team's as well as his first pole position. Haas became the first US-based constructor to take pole since Shadow Racing Cars at the 1975 British Grand Prix.

Complete Formula One results
(key)

References

External links 
 Official website

2022 Formula One season cars
VF-22